Marc McLaughlin (born July 26, 1999) is an American professional ice hockey center for the Providence Bruins of the American Hockey League (AHL) as a prospect for the Boston Bruins of the National Hockey League (NHL). He played NCAA hockey with the Boston College Eagles, where he was captain for his junior and senior seasons. He was a member of United States national team at the 2022 Winter Olympics.

Playing career
McLaughlin was a fairly unheralded player when he debuted for Boston College in the fall of 2018. As a freshman, he provided minimal offense for an underwhelming squad that finished the year with the program's first losing record in over 20 years. While the team improved the following year greatly, McLaughlin's offense only saw modest improvements. Unfortunately, due to the COVID-19 pandemic, the Eagles' season ended prematurely.

Banking on his ability as a defensive forward, McLaughlin was named team captain entering his junior year. While the pandemic delayed the entire college hockey circuit, McLaughlin took charge when he finally hit the ice. He finished second on the team in scoring and helped BC return to the NCAA Tournament. As a senior, McLaughlin continued to lead the way offensively; however, Boston College had another subpar season and slipped down the Hockey East standings. Regardless of the team's performance, McLaughlin was still held in high regard and was named to the United States national team after the NHL announced that it would not be sending its players to the Winter Olympics, McLaughlin went scoreless in two games while the team finished 5th out of 12 teams.

After the conclusion of his senior year, McLaughlin signed a two-year entry-level contract with the Boston Bruins on March 15, 2022. He made his NHL debut for the Bruins on March 31, 2022, scoring his first career goal in an 8–1 victory over the New Jersey Devils.

Career statistics

Regular season and playoffs

International

Awards and honors

References

External links

1999 births
Living people
American men's ice hockey centers
Boston Bruins players
Boston College Eagles men's ice hockey players
Cedar Rapids RoughRiders players
Ice hockey players at the 2022 Winter Olympics
Olympic ice hockey players of the United States
Ice hockey people from Massachusetts
People from Billerica, Massachusetts
Providence Bruins players
Undrafted National Hockey League players